Giorgi Loria  (born 27 January 1986) is a Georgian professional footballer who plays as a goalkeeper for Cypriot First Division club Anorthosis Famagusta FC.

Club career
During the 2014–15 season, Loria played for OFI Crete but due to the club's financial problems he left the club at the end of the season. According to a source, Loria had reached a verbal agreement with PAOK F.C. in early 2015, however he did not sign for the team.

The keeper was eventually signed by Olympiacos as a back-up of Roberto, since the second-choice goalkeeper Balázs Megyeri had left the Greek giants. Loria signed with Olympiacos for a two-year contract. OFI was rumored to have accepted a bid in the region of €700,000, as Loria was among the top goalies in the 2014-15 season. However, there are strong indications that the player was actually signed on a free transfer.

Loria quickly left Olympiacos due to personal issues and increased competition with teammates Stefanos Kapino and Andreas Gianniotis for the team's #2, while Roberto is undoubtedly the team's first-choice under their goalposts and one of Thrylos' captains. Olympiacos' latest intention to invest in the two young Greek prospects' development was a contributing factor for Loria's decision to leave the squad. Both the player and the club agreed that it is best to part ways. He signed for the Russian Premier League side Krylia Sovetov Samara shortly after.

On 21 August 2017, following Krylia Sovetov's relegation from the Russian Premier League, he joined Anzhi Makhachkala on loan for 2017–18 season.

On 18 January 2019, Loria signed with 2. Bundesliga side Magdeburg.

Anorthosis Famagusta

On 4 July 2019, he signed with Cypriot club Anorthosis Famagusta.

International career
Loria also plays for the national team of Georgia. He played the first two matches of 2010 FIFA World Cup qualification (UEFA).

Career statistics

Club

Notes

Honours
Anorthosis
 Cypriot Cup: 2020–21
 Cypriot Super Cup: Runner-Up 2021

Dinamo Tbilisi
 Georgian League: 2007–08, 2012–13, 2013–14
 Georgian Cup: 2008–09, 2012–13, 2013–14
 Georgian Super Cup: 2006, 2008

References

External links

 
 
 

1986 births
Living people
Footballers from Georgia (country)
Georgia (country) international footballers
Georgia (country) under-21 international footballers
Association football goalkeepers
FC Dinamo Tbilisi players
OFI Crete F.C. players
Olympiacos F.C. players
Expatriate footballers from Georgia (country)
Expatriate sportspeople from Georgia (country) in Greece
Expatriate footballers in Greece
PFC Krylia Sovetov Samara players
Expatriate footballers in Russia
Erovnuli Liga players
Super League Greece players
Russian Premier League players
FC Anzhi Makhachkala players
2. Bundesliga players
Anorthosis Famagusta F.C. players
Expatriate footballers in Cyprus